is a railway station on the Keihan Main Line in Higashiyama-ku, Kyoto, Japan, operated by the private railway operator Keihan Electric Railway.

Lines
Gion-Shijō Station is served by the Keihan Main Line. All types of passenger trains, from local to limited express, stop at the station.

Station layout

The station in a double track section has one underground island platform with two tracks. Stairs, escalators and elevators connect the platform on the second basement to the first basement concourse and then to the ground level.

Platforms

History
The station opened on October 27, 1915. The tracks and the station facilities were moved to the underground on May 24, 1987. The station was originally named  after Shijō Street as it is located where the railway along the bank of the Kamo River crosses Shijō Street.

Since 1981, there had been two stations along Shijō Street named Shijō; the other is on the Karasuma Line subway. At last, the Keihan station was renamed Gion-Shijō Station on October 19, 2008, the date of opening of the Nakanoshima Line.

Surrounding area
 Yasaka Shrine
 Gion
 Miyagawachō
 Pontochō
 Kawaramachi Station on the Hankyu Kyoto Line

Adjacent stations

References

External links
 Station map by Keihan Electric Railway
 Okeihan.net entry on Gion-Shijō Station by Keihan Electric Railway 

Railway stations in Kyoto
Railway stations in Japan opened in 1915